Independence Day is a BBC Books original novel written by Peter Darvill-Evans and based on the long-running British science fiction television series Doctor Who. It features the Seventh Doctor and Ace.

Synopsis
The Doctor wishes to return a communications device he had borrowed from the Mendeb system years ago. Being a time lord, he reasons he can put it back before anybody notices anything is wrong. However, when he arrives he comes to believe he is far too late to fix things; an invasion seems to have resulted because of his actions.

Continuity
 The book also features a brief appearance by the Second Doctor and Jamie McCrimmon, however they do not interact in person with the Seventh Doctor or Ace.
 Ace almost leaves the Doctor towards the end of this novel. She would eventually leave the Doctor first in the novel Love and War, and again later in Set Piece.

Outside References
The book references the movie Withnail and I. Many years after the movie was made, but prior to the release of this novel, its stars Paul McGann and Richard E. Grant would eventually become the Eighth Doctor and the voice of the Shalka Doctor, respectively.

External links

2000 British novels
2000 science fiction novels
Past Doctor Adventures
Seventh Doctor novels
Novels by Peter Darvill-Evans
BBC Books books